The Headboys were a Scottish power pop band, formed in 1977 in Edinburgh, Scotland, originally under the name  of Badger.

Career
The band is best known for its single, "The Shape of Things to Come", which entered the UK Singles Chart on 22 September 1979. The track spent eight weeks on the chart, reaching number 45. This secured the band an appearance on Top of the Pops on 11 October 1979; the debut show for host Andy Peebles.

The group released an album in 1979 on Robert Stigwood's RSO label, which was produced by Peter Ker (who also worked with The Motors, and Bram Tchaikovsky).

The lack of any other UK chart hit left them labelled as one-hit wonders.

In 2013, the band announced on their Facebook page that the ten tracks they had recorded for a follow-up album, but which remained unreleased, would be issued on CD under the title The Lost Album by the American record label, Pop Detective Records. The album, issued on 1 December that year, was dedicated to the memory of drummer Davy Ross, who died in 2010.

Band members
Lou Lewis — guitar and vocals
George Boyter — bass and vocals
Calum Malcolm — keyboards and vocals
Davy Ross — drums and vocals
 Bob Heatlie — keyboards, sax, vocals

Discography

Albums
The Headboys (1979), US #113 Canada #69  AUS #43
The Lost Album (2013)

Singles

See also
Video Concert Hall

References

External links
Band biography
Lyrics for "The Shape of Things to Come"

Musical groups established in 1977
Scottish new wave musical groups
Scottish rock music groups
Scottish power pop groups
RSO Records artists
Musical groups from Edinburgh